Alajuela orthobunyavirus (ALJV) is a species in the genus Orthobunyavirus in the Gamboa serogroup. It is isolated from mosquitoes, Aedeomyia squamipennis. It has not been reported to cause disease in humans.

References 

Orthobunyaviruses